Pioneer Heights is a group name in the Heritage Range, Ellsworth Mountains, encompassing the large area of hills, ridges and peaks located eastward of Schneider and Schanz Glaciers and between Splettstoesser and Union Glaciers. Among these features are the Inferno Ridge, the Nimbus Hills, Gross, Buchanan and Collier Hills. The Pioneer Heights were mapped by the United States Geological Survey (USGS) from ground surveys and U.S. Navy air photos from 1961 to 1966. The name was applied by the Advisory Committee on Antarctic Names (US-ACAN) in association with the name Heritage Range.

See also
 Mountains in Antarctica

Geographical features include:

Gross Hills

Inferno Ridge

Nimbus Hills

Samuel Nunataks

Other Nimbus Hills features

Other features

 Buchanan Hills
 Collier Hills
 Donald Ridge
 Flanagan Glacier
 Johnson Neck
 Mount Sporli
 Mount Virginia
 Rennell Glacier
 Ronald Ridge
 Schmidt Glacier (Antarctica)
 Thompson Escarpment
 Union Glacier

References
 

Mountains of Ellsworth Land